Ablach may refer to:

 Ablach (Danube), a right tributary of the Danube in Baden-Württemberg, Germany
 Ablach (Krauchenwies), a village part of Krauchenwies, a municipality in the district of Sigmaringen in Baden-Württemberg, Germany
 Emain Ablach, a mythical island paradise in Irish mythology